Śpigiel  is a village in the administrative district of Gmina Reszel, within Kętrzyn County, Warmian-Masurian Voivodeship, in northern Poland. The village has a population of 8.

References

Villages in Kętrzyn County